Gregory Mark LaRocca (born November 10, 1972) is an American former Major League Baseball (MLB) second baseman who played for the San Diego Padres and Cleveland Indians between 2000 and 2003. He also played in the Nippon Professional Baseball league from 2004 to 2010.

Biography 
LaRocca attended Manchester High School West in Manchester, New Hampshire and the University of Massachusetts Amherst. In 1993, he played collegiate summer baseball with the Orleans Cardinals of the Cape Cod Baseball League. He was drafted by the San Diego Padres in the 10th round (262nd overall) of the 1994 MLB Draft.

Major League Baseball

Minor Leagues (1994–1999) 
LaRocca played for Low-A Spokane Indians and High-A Rancho Cucamonga Quakes. The 1995 season was split between High-A Rancho Cucamonga Quakes and AA Memphis Chicks. The entire 1996 season was played for AA Memphis Chicks. LaRocca played all of 1997 for AA Mobile BayBears. The 1998 season was played for AAA Las Vegas Stars. LaRocca stayed in AAA Las Vegas for all of 1999 as well.

San Diego Padres (2000)
LaRocca started the 2000 season in AAA Las Vegas.  He was a September call-up when MLB rosters expand beyond the traditional 25-man roster. LaRocca made his MLB debut on September 7, 2000. He played 13 games with a total of 27 at-bats. He accumulated 4 singles, 2 doubles, and 1 walk.  His batting line for the 2000 season ended with a .222 average, .293 slugging, and .546 On Base + Slugging (OPS). LaRocca played three different infield positions in the 2000 season.  8 games at third base, 4 at shortstop, and 2 at second base with a 0.939 fielding percentage. He was released by the Padres on March 28, 2001.

Cleveland Indians (2001–2003)
On May 7, 2001, LaRocca signed with the Cleveland Indians. LaRocca did not play in the Majors during the 2001 season. He split the year between the AA Akron Aeros and AAA Buffalo Bisons. During the 2002 season, LaRocca split time between AAA Buffalo and the Indians.  In Cleveland, he played over 21 games collecting 14 hits over 52 at bats, collecting a triple and 4 doubles.  His batting line for the 2002 season ended with a .269 average, .365 slugging, and .732 OPS.  La Rocca played third base, second base, and designated hitter (DH). LaRocca started and ended his 2003 season with the Bisons.  He spent the last part of September with Cleveland playing in 5 games at third base and DH.  He amassed 3 hits over 9 at-bats, including one double.

Nippon Professional Baseball

Hiroshima Carp (2004–2005)
In 2004 he joined the Hiroshima Toyo Carp . At first, the signing did not attract much attention before the opening of the season. It was cheaper signing, with the Carp obtaining a middle of the order hitter that can hit the ball to all fields.  When the season began, he maintained a high batting average and hit 26 homers in the first half. In the second half LaRocca did not slow down, reaching the batting average of .328, 40 home runs, 101 RBI, ranking fifth place in all three batting groups. LaRocca's .328 average was second in the league. However, he recorded 66 strikeouts for the season.

In 2005 LaRocca batted 4th from the beginning and kept high batting average, but an injury to his hand caused his season to be cut to only 80 games. However, he managed to hit .303 with 18 home runs and 56 RBI. On November 18, 2005, LaRocca, along with Tom Davey , Kenny Rayborn were designated for assignment, then traded to the Yakult Swallows.

Yakult Swallows (2006) 
In 2006, Yakult formed a strong central axis with teammates Alex Ramirez , Adam Riggs and LaRocca. The nickname "F-Brothers" was attached to the three foreign fielders by fans. The 2006 season was a success, but was sidelined in August with a knee injury that required surgery. That season, LaRocca played 103 games, batted .285, 18 home runs. On December 1, LaRocca became a free agent. He then joined the Orix Buffaloes who wanted a reliable middle of the order batter.

Orix Buffaloes (2007–2010) 
For the 2007 season, LaRocca was appointed the starting third baseman and number 3 hitter in the order.  Through the first few weeks of May, he hit .300 with 17 home runs.  LaRocca broke the 55-year old NPB record of hit-by-pitches in a single season with 28. In 2008, LaRocca he complained of right elbow pain, and did not play after May 5. On May 28, the team announced that LaRocca had undergone reconstructive surgery of his right Ulnar Collateral Ligament, also known as Tommy John surgery.  This surgery caused his season to come to an end, and the Buffaloes considered releasing LaRocca.

In 2009, LaRocca renegotiated his contract and took a substantial salary reduction and agreed to a contract on January 28. The Buffaloes acquired Jose Fernandez to play third base, so LaRocca played first base. On opening day against the Lotte, three consecutive home runs were recorded for the first time in three years by himself and two other teammates. With Alex Cabrera and Tuffy Rhodes injured, LaRocca filled the hole of Fernández who was also injured. He was bumped to batting 4th, and hit 12 home runs. However, in the game against Softbank on July 28, he was hit by a pitch for the 100th time in his career, thirteenth in NPB history, from Masahiko Morifuku.  On that HBP, LaRocca broke his right hand and was out for the remainder of the season. With LaRocca being repeatedly sidelined, the team once again considered releasing him.  However, his contract was affordable, so LaRocca returned for the 2010 season.

In 2010, LaRocca was mostly DH, with playing one game at first base. In a game against Rakuten on March 22, LaRocca hit a two-run home run off of Rei Nagai. However, in a game against Rakuten on April 10, he was hit by a pitch and fractured his pinky finger. However, in an effort to preserve his season, LaRocca covered the affected part of the little finger with a metal plate, attached to a shock absorbing pad from the top of the batting glove. To much success, he hit 4 home runs while fractured. However, as Aarom Baldiris began to rise, LaRocca mainly played as DH and pinch hitter.  He later injured his back and was put on the disabled list on May 25.  After the season, LaRocca retired from professional baseball.

Retirement 
LaRocca was a scout for the Orix Buffaloes from 2011–2016.  He scouted players from the United States to play for the NPB. LaRocca was the manager for the Granite State Games, a high school showcase in New Hampshire. LaRocca is a hitting and fielding instructor in New Hampshire for both private and team consulting.

Style of play 
LaRocca was a middle of the order hitter that pulled the ball to left field. When he signed with Orix, he formed "big boys batting line" with Tuffy Rhodes and Alex Cabrera (including Jose Fernandez in 2009 season). When reporters asked the reasons for the strong showing at Orix, "Tuffy hits behind me, I can swing the bat carefully and I can swing the bat hard" putting trust in Rhodes.

He played second, third, and first base during his career.  LaRocca had good command of all positions, earning a .945 career fielding percentage at all levels. He excited fans in Japan with many diving stops and throws on the run.

LaRocca was often injured in Japan due to hit by pitches and while of defense.

Hit by pitch 
LaRocca was known in Japan as a player who was often hit by pitches.  In 2007, he was hit 28 times, which is a NPB record. In seven seasons up to 2010, he has recorded 109 HBP. During this time, the number of at-bats per HBP was about 21.8 (2375 AB / 109 HBP), more than twice as much as the previous record.

In 2007 he received 20 HBP in the first half of the season. Before the All-Star Game, LaRocca said "I thought that there would be no [hit by pitches] in the All-Star game", but he received a ball from Koharu Uehara in the first bat. Because there was little damage, the pitcher spread both hands to appeal for health. At the moment when he received the 25th HBP of the season from Shibuya Naoyuki on September 17 against Lotte Marines, when he passed the Japanese record set by Yoshiyuki Iwamoto, LaRocca waved hands towards the audience and also bowed.  In the same year's salary negotiation, it turned out that LaRocca was hoping for an "unprecedented" incentive at the number of HBP ". Among the increase in annual salary, "treatment expenses" of injuries caused by HBP were included.

Personal life 
September 28, 2007, the Orix team announced that it would donate 100 million yen to the Research Promotion Foundation for Spina Bifida and Hydrocephalus. LaRocca revealed how he offered the donation "I want to repay for Japan" under the influence of his wife. Greg is married to his wife, Amanda.  They have two children together.  They reside in New Hampshire.

LaRocca has played in the Wounded Warriors Project softball game in 2016 and 2017 on the celebrity team.  This game is to raise money to aid veterans who were injured in combat.

Statistics

Batting Performance by Year 

*The bold in each year is the highest in league, the Italics is the highest in NPB

Records and awards

Awardswards 
 All Star : 2 times (2004: second baseman, 2007: third baseman)

Records

NPB Firsts 
 First appearance: April 2, 2004, vs. Chunichi Dragons
 First hit: April 2, 2004 vs. Chunichi Dragons
 First Steal Base: April 9, 2004, Yokohama Bay Stars
 First home run: April 9, 2004, Yokohama Bay Stars
 First Hit By Pitch: April 14, 2004, Hanshin Tigers

NPB Milestones 
 100 homers: August 28, 2007, Fukuoka Softbank Hawks  
 251st person in history
 100 HBP: July 28, 2009 Fukuoka SoftBank Hawks
 13th in history (the fastest in history)

NPB Records 
 Season 28 HBP (2007, Japan professional baseball record)
 1 inning 2 home runs: May 11, 2006, Seibu Lions (17th in history)
 All-Star game participation: 2 times (2004, 2007)

Jersey numbers 
 20 (2000)
 62 (2002–2003)
 43 (2004–2005)
 29 (2006)
 30 (2007–2010)

References

External links



1972 births
Living people
Baseball players from New York (state)
Major League Baseball infielders
Orleans Firebirds players
Akron Aeros players
Buffalo Bisons (minor league) players
San Diego Padres players
Cleveland Indians players
Hiroshima Toyo Carp players
Tokyo Yakult Swallows players
Orix Buffaloes players
American expatriate baseball players in Japan
UMass Minutemen baseball players
Las Vegas Stars (baseball) players
Memphis Chicks players
Mobile BayBears players
Rancho Cucamonga Quakes players
Spokane Indians players